Ichoca is a small village in the Ancash Region, Peru. It has a population of 321 [2017 census] and is located in the Marca District, Recuay Province.

References

Populated places in the Ancash Region